
 

Joanna is a locality in the Australian state of South Australia located in the state's south-east within the state’s Limestone Coast region about  south east of the state capital of Adelaide, about  south-east of the municipal seat of Naracoorte.

Joanna started as a private subdivision. Boundaries were created in April 2001 for the “long established name” which is derived from the cadastral unit of the Hundred of Joanna which was named in 1862 after the daughter of Dominick Daly, the then Governor of South Australia.

The majority land use within the locality is primary production.  The locality includes land proclaimed for conservation purposes as the Naracoorte Caves National Park.

The full extent of the national park was listed on 17 May 2017 as a state heritage place on the South Australian Heritage Register with the name of the Naracoorte Caves Complex.

Joanna shares a single CFS brigade with the neighbouring locality of Wrattonbully.

Joanna is located within the federal Division of Barker, the state electoral district of MacKillop, and the local government area of the Naracoorte Lucindale Council.

References
Notes

Citations

Limestone Coast